St. Francis Academy was an all-girls' Catholic senior high school in southern San Antonio, Texas.

The Sisters of Saint Francis opened the school in 1960. The school closed in 2002, due to financial issues. It was the fifth Catholic school to be scheduled to close in a 10-year period ending in January 2002. After Saint Francis shut down, there were two all-girls' Catholic high schools remaining in San Antonio. After the closure of St. Francis the girls of southern and western San Antonio no longer had their own Catholic high school.

The John H. Wood, Jr. Charter School System (now known as Braination) reopened the campus as a charter school in 2003.

In the 2009-2010 school year Holy Cross of San Antonio, a previously all boys' secondary Catholic school serving the same areas that St. Francis did, opened its enrollment to girls.

References

Further reading 
 Rangel, Susan. "Changes to greet students at St. Francis Academy." La Prensa de San Antonio. August 17, 2003.
 Gutierrez, Bridget. "Parochial problems Archdiocesan schools' enrollments shrinking." San Antonio Express News. Section Metro / South Texas. March 15, 2003. Document ID: 0F9DEC3A81075C67.
 Gutierrez, Bridget "Hail and farewell St. Francis Academy graduates 34 seniors today then it will close its doors after 42 years." San Antonio Express-News. May 26, 2002. Section: Metro / South Texas. Document ID: 0F3D09CCEAF00DB2.

External links
  (as a Catholic school) - hosted at Geocities
  (as a charter school)

Girls' schools in Texas
1960 establishments in Texas
Educational institutions established in 1960
2002 disestablishments in Texas
Educational institutions disestablished in 2002
Catholic secondary schools in Texas
High schools in San Antonio